Boulia Airport  is an airport in Boulia, Queensland, Australia.

Airlines and destinations

Regular services operated by Regional Express Airlines are under contract to the Government of Queensland.

See also
 List of airports in Queensland

References

Airports in Queensland